Randi Kolstad  (born Randi Ballestad, later known as Randi Borch, May 23, 1925 – October 6, 1999) was a Norwegian theater and screen actress.

Kolstad made her film debut in 1951 in Kranes konditori. She appeared in 14 films. She participated in preparing the script for the 1954 film Portrettet.

Family
Randi Kolstad was the daughter of daughter of the associate professor Thor Ballestad (1891–1970) and Hjørdis Marie Ruud (1902–1973). She was married to the actor Lasse Kolstad from 1946 to 1955. She later remarried Hans Jacob Astrup Borch (1924–1996) and took the surname Borch.

Filmography

 1951: Kranes konditori as Borghild Stordal
 1952: Nødlanding as Kristin
 1952: Vi vil skilles as Bitten Dahl
 1953: Brudebuketten as Siv Blom
 1955: The Summer Wind Blows as Eivor, engaged to Klaus
 1956: På solsiden as Ester Riibe, Hartvig's wife
 1957: Seventeen Years Old as Lydia Hennert, a singer
 1958: Lån meg din kone as Anita (credited as Randi Borch)
 1962: Sønner av Norge kjøper bil as Anette Winkelbo
 1964: Klokker i måneskinn as the wife (credited as Randi Borch)
 1966: Hurra for Andersens as Mrs. Hermansen (credited as Randi Borch)
 1969: Himmel og helvete as Berit, Eva's mother (credited as Randi Borch)
 1971: Gråt elskede mann (credited as Randi Borch)

References

External links
 
 Randi Kolstad at the Swedish Film Database
 Randi Kolstad at Filmfront
 Randi Kolstad Borch at Sceneweb

1925 births
1999 deaths
20th-century Norwegian actresses
People from Skien